The 1998 Belarusian Premier League was the eighth season of top-tier football in Belarus.  It started on April 12 and ended on October 31, 1998. Dinamo Minsk were the defending champions.

Team changes from 1997 season
Two worst teams of the last season (Torpedo-Kadino Mogilev and Shakhtyor Soligorsk) relegated to the First League. They were replaced by two best clubs of 1996 First League (FC Gomel and BATE Borisov).

In the early days of January it was announced that Transmash Mogilev ceased to exist as an independent club merged with Dnepr Mogilev (with the latter being renamed to Dnepr-Transmash Mogilev). Ataka Minsk, who suffered heavy financial troubles, let go all their senior team players and failed to confirm their participation in the new season by a deadline in early March. A week later BFF announced that Ataka Minsk were excluded from the league and that two vacant places (left by Transmash and Ataka) are being filled by Torpedo-Kadino Mogilev and Shakhtyor Soligorsk, both of whom were spared from relegation.

Before the start of the season, MPKC Mozyr changed their name to Slavia Mozyr.

Overview
Dnepr-Transmash Mogilev won their 1st champions title and qualified for the next season's Champions League. The championship runners-up BATE Borisov as well as bronze medalists and 1998–99 Cup winners Belshina Bobruisk qualified for UEFA Cup. Kommunalnik Slonim finished on last, 15th place and relegated to First League. Dinamo-93 Minsk dissolved and withdrew from the championship after 15 rounds. They were excluded from the final table and their results were annulled.

Teams and venues

Table

Results

Belarusian clubs in European Cups

Top scorers

See also
1998 Belarusian First League
1997–98 Belarusian Cup
1998–99 Belarusian Cup

External links
RSSSF

Belarusian Premier League seasons
1
Belarus
Belarus